Eucyclopera minuta is a moth of the family Erebidae first described by Walter Rothschild in 1912. It is found in Papua New Guinea.

The length of the forewings is about 7 mm. The forewings are white, the basal half of the wing brownish sooty grey from the middle of the cell to the hind margin. There is a broad subterminal and a narrow terminal line, both are pale grey. The hindwings are greyish white.

References

Nudariina
Moths described in 1912